Pertti Tikka (born 12 May 1955 in Tohmajärvi) is a Finnish ski-orienteering competitor and world champion. He received an individual gold medal at the World Ski Orienteering Championships in Avesta in 1980. He received a silver medal in 1982, and a bronze medal in 1984.

See also
 Finnish orienteers
 List of orienteers
 List of orienteering events

References

1955 births
Living people
Finnish orienteers
Male orienteers
Ski-orienteers